La Luz de Jesus Gallery is a commercial art gallery located in Los Angeles, California.  It is closely associated with the Lowbrow Art Movement, Kustom Kulture, and pop surrealism.

History

La Luz de Jesus Gallery was established in 1986 in Los Angeles, California by entrepreneur and art collector Billy Shire.  The original gallery was located in a bright pink building on Melrose Avenue, upstairs from Shire's retail store Soap Plant/ Wacko.  As Melrose Avenue became increasingly gentrified, the gallery was relocated to the Los Feliz / Silverlake district on Hollywood Boulevard near Vermont Avenue.  The early years of La Luz de Jesus gallery, before its relocation to Hollywood Boulevard, coincide with the Golden Age of Lowbrow.  In April 2005, Shire opened a sister gallery, Billy Shire Fine Arts, in Culver City, California.

Mission and influence

La Luz de Jesus Gallery provides both an exhibition space and a support structure to Lowbrow and pop surrealist artists.  The gallery's mission is to make underground artists and counterculture accessible to the general public.  In a 1988 interview with the Los Angeles Times, Shire sums up the gallery's philosophy by saying, "Art should be by the people and for the people.  It should be something that speaks to you, that entertains and challenges and changes your outlook."  The gallery presents a new exhibit each month with an opening reception on the first Friday of every month.  The gallery shows primarily figurative and narrative painting and unusual sculpture, with a focus on themes and styles including folk art, outsider art, religious art, and alternative erotica.  The gallery has been the first to introduce to the public many then-unknown artists who have gone on to claim their place in the art world. These artists include Manuel Ocampo, Joe Coleman, Shag, and Robert Williams.  Other notable artists that have exhibited at the gallery include Marco Almera, and Joe Sorren.  In addition to regular solo and two-person shows, the gallery also hosts a variety of group shows, including a much-anticipated annual group exhibition entitled "Everything But the Kitschen Sync" which introduces relatively unknown and emerging artists at the beginning of their careers.

References

 La Luz De Jesus website
 LA.COM Review "It's art over the counterculture"
 Fodor's Review
 The Los Angeles Times, 17 July 1988, "Folk Art with a Touch of Madness" by Denise Hamilton
 http://www.absolutearts.com/artsnews/2010/08/08/publish/2348910398.html
 http://www.losangeles.com/la-luz-de-jesus-gallery-b95553
 http://forthmagazine.com/events/around-town/2010/05/la-luz-de-jesus-gallery-presents-rogue-taxidermy/

Contemporary art galleries in the United States
Art museums and galleries in Los Angeles
1986 establishments in California
Kustom Kulture
Underground culture
Art galleries established in 1986
Silver Lake, Los Angeles